PZK may refer to:

 Polski Związek Krótkofalowców, an amateur radio organization in Poland
 Polish Cycling Federation (Polski Związek Kolarski), a cycling organization in Poland